The  is one of the armaments expansion plan of the Imperial Japanese Navy (IJN).

Background
In October 1940, the IJN schemed building of the submarines and auxiliary vessels because there was a shortage of them.

Table of vessels

See also
1st Naval Armaments Supplement Programme (Maru 1 Keikaku, 1931)
2nd Naval Armaments Supplement Programme (Maru 2 Keikaku, 1934)
3rd Naval Armaments Supplement Programme (Maru 3 Keikaku, 1937)
4th Naval Armaments Supplement Programme (Maru 4 Keikaku, 1939)
Rapidly Naval Armaments Supplement Programme (Maru Kyū Keikaku, 1941)
Additional Naval Armaments Supplement Programme (Maru Tui Keikaku, 1941)
5th Naval Armaments Supplement Programme (Maru 5 Keikaku, 1941)
6th Naval Armaments Supplement Programme (Maru 6 Keikaku, 1942)
Modified 5th Naval Armaments Supplement Programme (Kai-Maru 5 Keikaku, 1942)
Wartime Naval Armaments Supplement Programme (Maru Sen Keikaku, 1944)

References
Rekishi Gunzō series, Gakken (Japan)
The Maru Special series, Ushio Shobō
Daiji Katagiri, Ship Name Chronicles of the Imperial Japanese Navy Combined Fleet, Kōjinsha (Japan), June 1988, 
 Senshi Sōsho Vol.31, Naval armaments and war preparation (1), "Until November 1941", Asagumo Simbun (Japan), November 1969

Naval Armaments Supplement Programme
Naval Armaments Supplement Programme